In the Wings may refer to:

 In the Wings (Froman book), a book by Kyle Froman
 In the Wings (horse), a Thoroughbred racehorse
 In the Wings (play), a play by Stewart F. Lane
 In the Wings: A Memoir, a book by Diana Douglas